Mammoth Hot Springs is a large complex of hot springs on a hill of travertine in Yellowstone National Park adjacent to Fort Yellowstone and the Mammoth Hot Springs Historic District.  It was created over thousands of years as hot water from the spring cooled and deposited calcium carbonate (over two tons flow into Mammoth each day in a solution). Because of the huge amount of geothermal vents, travertine flourishes. Although these springs lie outside the caldera boundary, their energy has been attributed to the same magmatic system that fuels other Yellowstone geothermal areas.

The hot water that feeds Mammoth comes from Norris Geyser Basin after traveling underground via a fault line  that runs through limestone and roughly parallel to the Norris-to-Mammoth road. The limestone from rock formations along the fault is the source of the calcium carbonate. Algae living in the warm pools have tinted the travertine shades of brown, orange, red, and green.

Thermal activity here is extensive both over time and distance.  The thermal flows show much variability with some variations taking place over periods ranging from decades to days. Terrace Mountain at Mammoth Hot Springs is the largest known carbonate-depositing spring in the world. The most famous feature at the springs is the Minerva Terrace, a series of travertine terraces. The terraces have been deposited by the spring over many years but, due to recent minor earthquake activity, the spring vent has shifted, rendering the terraces dry.

The Mammoth Terraces extend all the way from the hillside, across the Parade Ground, and down to Boiling River. The Mammoth Hotel, as well as all of Fort Yellowstone, is built upon an old terrace formation known as Hotel Terrace. There was some concern when construction began in 1891 on the fort site that the hollow ground would not support the weight of the buildings. Several large sink holes (fenced off) can be seen out on the Parade Ground. This area has been thermally active for several thousand years.

The Mammoth area exhibits much evidence of glacial activity from the Pinedale Glaciation. The summit of Terrace Mountain is covered with glacial till, thereby dating the travertine formation there to earlier than the end of the Pinedale Glaciation. Several thermal kames, including Capitol Hill and Dude Hill, are major features of the Mammoth Village area. Ice-marginal stream beds are in evidence in the small, narrow valleys where Floating Island Lake and Phantom Lake are found. In Gardner Canyon one can see the old, sorted gravel bed of the Gardner River covered by unsorted glacial till.

Individually named thermal features

 Angel Spring 1 
 Angel Spring 2 
 Angel Spring 3 
 Aphrodite Terrace 
 Baby Terrace 
 Bath Lake 
 Blue Springs 
 Canary Spring 
 Cavern Terrace 
 Cedar Tree Spring 
 Cheops Mound 
 Cleopatra Terrace 
 Cupid Spring 
 Dedolph Spring-a 
 Dedolph Spring-b 
 Dedolph Spring-c 
 Devil's Kitchen Springs (The Sodas) 
 Devils Thumb (Hot Spring)|Devils Thumb 
 Fan Spring 
 Fissure Ridge 
 Glen Springs 
 Highland Terrace 
 Hymen Terrace 
 Ladies' Lake 
 Liberty Cap 
 Little Burper 
 Little Joker 
 Little Lucifer 
 Main Springs and Terrace 
 Marble Terrace 
 Minerva Terrace 
 Mound Terrace 
 Naid Spring 
 Narrow Gauge Terrace 
 New Blue Spring 
 New Highland Terrace 
 New Pallette Springs 
 Opal Terrace  (across the road from Liberty Cap)
 Orange Mound Spring
 Painted Pool 
 Palette Spring 
 Paperpicker Spring 
 Poison Cave 
 Poison Spring (Gaseous Hot Spring) 
 Prospect Springs and Terrace 
 Pulpit Terrace 
 Rath Spring and Terrace 
 Reservoir Springs 
 River Styx-a 
 River Styx-b 
 Sidewalk Spring 
 Soda Spring (Bargar-Allen & Day) 
 Squirrel Springs and Squirrel Ridge 
 Sulphur Pits 
 Sulphur Spring 
 Tangerine Spring 
 The Buttress 
 The Esplanade (Hot Spring)|The Esplanade 
 The Grottos 
 Trail Springs 
 White Elephant Back Terrace

See also
 Geothermal areas of Yellowstone

References

Geothermal features of Yellowstone National Park
Geothermal features of Park County, Wyoming
Hot springs of Wyoming